Regional elections were held in some regions of Italy during 1964. These included:

Friuli-Venezia Giulia on 10 May 
Trentino-Alto Adige on 15 November

Elections in Italian regions
1964 elections in Italy